Pleurophora is a genus of flowering plants belonging to the family Lythraceae.

Its native range is Venezuela, Central and Eastern Brazil to Southern South America.

Species:

Pleurophora annulosa 
Pleurophora anomala 
Pleurophora patagonica 
Pleurophora polyandra 
Pleurophora pulchra 
Pleurophora pungens 
Pleurophora pusilla 
Pleurophora saccocarpa

References

Lythraceae
Lythraceae genera